The Tuscarora (in Tuscarora Skarù:ręˀ, "hemp gatherers" or "Shirt-Wearing People") are a Native American tribe and First Nations band government of the Iroquoian family, with members today in New York, USA, and Ontario, Canada. They coalesced as a people around the Great Lakes, likely about the same time as the rise of the Five Nations of the historic Iroquois Confederacy, also Iroquoian-speaking and based then in present-day New York.

Well before the arrival of Europeans in North America, the Tuscarora had migrated south and settled in the region now known as Eastern Carolina. The most numerous Indigenous people in the area, they lived along the Roanoke, Neuse, Tar (Torhunta or Narhontes), and Pamlico rivers. European explorers first encountered the Tuscarora people on land later incorporated into the colonies of North Carolina and Virginia. 

After the 18th-century wars of 1711–1713 (known as the Tuscarora War) against English colonists and their Indian allies, most of the surviving Tuscarora left North Carolina and migrated north to Pennsylvania and New York, over a period of 90 years. They aligned with the Iroquois in New York, because of their ancestral linguistic and cultural connections. Sponsored by the Oneida, they were accepted in 1722 as the Sixth Nation of the Iroquois Confederacy, or Haudenosaunee. After the American Revolution, in which they and the Oneida allied with the colonists, the Tuscarora shared reservation land with the Oneida before gaining their own. The Tuscarora Nation of New York is federally recognized.

Those Tuscarora who allied with the British in the American Revolution resettled with other Iroquois tribes in present-day Ontario, where they are part of the Six Nations of the Grand River First Nation. Only the tribes in New York and Ontario have been recognized on a government-to-government basis by the respective national governments.  After the migration was completed in the early 18th century, the Tuscarora in New York no longer considered those remaining in North Carolina as members of the tribal nation. Since the late 20th century, some North Carolina persons claiming Tuscarora ancestry had formed bands in which they identify as Tuscarora. As of 2010, several bands in Robeson County have united on an interim basis as the Tuscarora Nation One Fire Council.

History

The historic nation encountered by Europeans in North Carolina had three tribes:
Kǎ'tě’nu'ā'kā', Katenuaka, Ga-te-no-wah-ga, or Kautanohakau ("People of the Submerged Pine-tree"),
Akawěñtc'ākā', Akawenteaka, Akawenchaka, Ag-wan-te-ga, Kauwetsaka, Kauwetseka or Cauwintch-AAga ("People of the Water", this was also the autonym of the Kauwets'a:ka or Meherrin.)
Skarū'ren', Skuarureaka or Sca-ru-re-ah-ga ("Hemp Gatherers"), today better known as Tuscarora.

These affiliations continued to be active as independent groups after the tribe migrated to New York and, later, Ontario. F.W. Hodge, an early 19th-century historian, wrote that the Tuscarora in North Carolina traditionally were said to occupy the "country lying between the sea shores and the mountains, which divide the Atlantic states," in which they had 24 large towns and could muster  about 6,000 warriors, probably meaning persons.

In late 17th and early 18th-century North Carolina, European colonists reported two primary branches of the Tuscarora: a northern group led by Chief Tom Blunt, and a southern group led by Chief Hancock. Varying accounts c. 1708 – 1710 estimated the number of Tuscarora warriors as from 1200 to 2000. Historians estimate their total population may have been three to four times that number.

Chief Blunt occupied the area around what is present-day Bertie County, North Carolina, on the Roanoke River. Chief Hancock lived closer to present-day New Bern, occupying the area south of the Pamlico River. Chief Blunt became close friends with the colonial Blount family of the Bertie region and lived peacefully.

By contrast, Chief Hancock had to deal with more numerous colonists encroaching on his community. They raided his villages and kidnapped people to sell into slavery. The colonists transported some Tuscarora to Pennsylvania to sell into slavery. Both groups of Tuscarora suffered substantial population losses after exposure to Eurasian infectious diseases endemic to Europeans. Both also suffered territorial encroachment. By 1711 Chief Hancock believed he had to attack the settlers to fight back. Chief Tom Blunt did not join him in the war.

The southern Tuscarora collaborated with the Pamlico, the Cothechney, the Coree, the Mattamuskeet and the Matchepungoe nations to attack the settlers in a wide range of locations within a short time period. Their principal targets were against the planters on the Roanoke, Neuse and Trent rivers, as well as the city of Bath. They attacked on September 22, 1711, beginning the Tuscarora War. The allied Indian tribes killed hundreds of settlers, including several key political figures among the colonists.

Governor Edward Hyde called out the North Carolina militia and secured the assistance of South Carolina, which provided 600 militia and 360 allied Native Americans commanded by Col. John Barnwell. In 1712, this force attacked the southern Tuscarora and other nations in Craven County at Fort Narhontes, on the banks of the Neuse River. The Tuscarora were "defeated with great slaughter; more than three hundred were killed, and one hundred made prisoners."

The governor offered Chief Blunt leadership of the entire Tuscarora Nation if he would assist in defeating Chief Hancock. Blunt succeeded in capturing Hancock, who was tried and executed by North Carolina officials. In 1713 the Southern Tuscarora were defeated at their Fort Neoheroka (formerly spelled Neherooka), with 900 killed or captured in the battle.

After the defeat in the battle of 1713, about 1500 Tuscarora fled north to New York to join the Iroquois Confederacy, while as many as 1500 additional Tuscarora sought refuge in the colony of Virginia. Although some accepted tributary status in Virginia, the majority of the surviving Tuscarora are believed to have returned to North Carolina. In 1715, seventy warriors of the southern Tuscarora went to South Carolina to assist colonists against the Yamasee. Those 70 warriors later asked permission to have their wives and children join them, and settled near Port Royal, South Carolina.

Under the leadership of Tom Blunt, the Tuscarora who remained in North Carolina signed a treaty with the colony in June 1718. It granted them a  tract of land on the Roanoke River in what is now Bertie County. This was the area occupied by Chief Blunt and his people. The colonies of Virginia and North Carolina both recognized Tom Blunt, who had taken the last name Blount, as "King Tom Blount" of the Tuscarora. Both colonies agreed to consider as friendly only those Tuscarora who accepted Blount's leadership. The remaining Southern Tuscarora were forced to remove from their villages on the Pamlico River and relocate to the villages of Ooneroy and Resootskeh in Bertie County. In 1722, the Bertie County Reservation, which would officially become known as "Indian Woods," was chartered by the colony.

As colonial settlement surrounded Indian Woods, the Tuscarora suffered discrimination and other acts: they were overcharged or denied use of ferries, restricted in hunting, and cheated in trade; their timber was illegally logged, and their lands were continuously encroached upon by herders and squatters. Over the next several decades, the colonial government continually reduced the Tuscarora tract, forcing cessions of land to the encroaching settlers. They sold off portions of the land in deals often designed to take advantage of the Tuscarora.

Many Tuscarora were not satisfied with the leadership of Tom Blount, and decided to leave the reservation. In 1722 300 fighting men; along with their wives, children, and the elderly, resided at Indian Woods. By 1731 there were 200 warriors, in 1755 there were 100, with a total population at Indian Woods of 301. When in 1752 Moravian missionaries visited the reservation, they had noted "many had gone north to live on the Susquehanna" and that "others are scattered as the wind scatters smoke." This refers to the Tuscarora migrating to central-western New York to live with the Oneida and other Iroquois nations.

In 1763 and 1766 additional Tuscarora migrated north to settle with other Iroquoian peoples in northern and western Pennsylvania (where the Susquehannock and Erie people both had territory) and New York. By 1767 only 104 persons were residing on the reservation in Bertie County. In 1804 the last band to leave North Carolina  went to New York. By then, only "10 to 20 Old families" remained at Indian Woods.

In 1802 the last Indian Woods Tuscarora negotiated a treaty with the United States, by which land would be held for them that they could lease. As the government never ratified the treaty, the North Carolina Tuscarora viewed the treaty as null and void. In 1831 the Indian Woods Tuscarora sold the remaining rights to their lands.

Although without a reservation, some Tuscarora descendants remained in the southern regions of the state. They intermarried with other residents. In 1971 the Tuscarora in Robeson County sought to get an accounting of their lands and rents due them under the unratified treaty of 1803. At least three bands have organized in Robeson County. In 2010 they united as one group.

Migration north
The Iroquois Five Nations of New York had penetrated as far as the Tuscarora homeland in North Carolina by 1701, and nominally controlled the entire frontier territory lying in between. Following their discovery of a linguistically related tribe living beyond Virginia, they were more than happy to accommodate their distant cousins within the Iroquois Constitution as the "Sixth Nation", and to resettle them in safer grounds to the north. (The Iroquois had driven tribes of rival Indians out of Western New York to South Carolina during the Beaver Wars several decades earlier, not far from where the Tuscarora resided.)

Beginning about 1713 after the war, contingents of Tuscarora began leaving North Carolina for the north. They established a main village at present-day Martinsburg, West Virginia, on what is still known as Tuscarora Creek. Another group stopped in 1719–1721 in present-day Maryland along the Monocacy River, on the way to join the Oneida nation in western New York. After white settlers began to pour into what is now the Martinsburg area from around 1730, the Tuscarora continued northward to join those in western New York. Other Tuscarora bands sojourned in the Juniata River valley of Pennsylvania, before reaching New York.

The present area from Martinsburg, West Virginia west to Berkeley Springs has roads, creeks, and land still named after the Tuscarora people, including a development in Hedgesville called "The Woods" where the street names contain reference to the Tuscarora people, and which contains a burial mound adopted by the West Virginia Division of Culture as an Archaeological Site in 1998. There is record circa 1763 that some Tuscarora had not migrated to the Iroquois, and remained in the Panhandle instead, stayed and fought under Shawnee Chief Cornstalk.

During the American Revolutionary War, part of the Tuscarora and Oneida nations in New York allied with the rebel colonists. Most of the warriors of the other four Iroquois nations supported Great Britain, and many participated in battles throughout New York. They were the main forces that attacked frontier settlements of the central Mohawk and Cherry valleys. Late in the war, the pro-British Tuscarora followed Chief Joseph Brant of the Mohawk, other British-allied tribes, and Loyalists north to Ontario, then called Upper Canada by the British. They took part in establishing the reserve of the Six Nations of the Grand River First Nation in what became Ontario, Canada.

In 1803 a final contingent of southern Tuscarora migrated to New York to join the reservation of their tribe in Niagara County. After that, the Tuscarora in New York no longer considered southern remnants as part of their nation. Some descendants of the southern remnants have continued to identify as Tuscarora and have organized some bands. Through the generations they had intermarried with neighbors but identify culturally as Tuscarora.

During the War of 1812 in the British attack on Lewiston, New York on December 19, 1813, a band of Tuscarora living in a village on an escarpment just above the town fought to save Americans fleeing the invasion force. The British were accompanied by allied Mohawk and some American Tories disguised as Mohawk. The American militia fled, leaving only the Tuscarora—outnumbered 30 to one—to fight a delaying action that allowed some townspeople to escape. The Tuscarora sent a party of braves to blow horns along the escarpment and suggest a larger force, while another party attacked downhill with war whoops, to give an exaggerated impression of their numbers. The British force burned Lewiston, as well as the Tuscarora village, then undefended.

The Tuscarora have continued to struggle to protect their land in New York. In the mid-20th century, New York City commissioner Robert Moses generated controversy by negotiating with the Tuscarora Sachem council and purchasing 550 acres of the Tuscarora reservation for the reservoir of the new hydroelectric project along the Niagara River, downriver from Niagara Falls. (At the time of first power generation in February 1962, it was the largest project in the world.) The plant continues to generate cheap electricity for households located from the Niagara area to as far away as New York City.

Language
Skarure, the Tuscarora language, is a member of the northern branch of the Iroquoian languages. Linguists and historians have both tried to determine when the Iroquoian-speaking Meherrin and Nottoway tribes separated from the Tuscarora. Before initial contact (1650), the English, based on reports from Algonquian natives, thought the three tribes were one people, as the Algonquian speakers referred to them by the exonym Mangoag. Following encounter by the English with the Tuscarora and other tribes, the colonists noted they used the same interpreters to translate with each of the peoples, which meant their languages were closely related.

Although the Nottoway language went extinct in the early 1900s, linguists have been able to determine that it was distinct, although closely related to Tuscarora. In addition, the Cheroenhaka (Nottoway) Tribe has been working to revitalize the Nottoway Language in recent times. In historic times, the three tribes always identified as distinct and independent peoples.

National government-recognized Tuscarora tribes
Tuscarora Nation at Lewiston, New York
Tuscarora at Six Nations of the Grand River, Ontario, Canada

Tuscarora bands in North Carolina
Several bands, groups, and organizations with members claiming Tuscarora descent reside in North Carolina. Since the late 20th century, they have organized and reformed in various configurations. None has state or federal recognition.

They have included the following:
Tuscarora Indian Nation of North Carolina, org. date: per Sec. of State, NC 05/08/1972, Robeson Co.
Southern Band Tuscarora Indian Tribe, Windsor;
Tuscarora Tribe of Indians Maxton (1979) effective date per Sec. of State NC, 08/20/1990,
Tuscarora Nation One Fire Council at Robeson County, North Carolina (formed in 2010 from several bands in Robeson County)
Tosneoc Tuscarora Community, Wilson County, original Homeland, Stantonsburg/Contentnea Creek area, North Carolina 
Skaroreh Katenuaka Nation
Cape Fear Band of Skarure Woccon (located mainly in Brunswick, Bladen, Columbus, and Pender Counties and also South Carolina)

Tuscarora tribal officials in New York dispute claims that anyone in North Carolina has continuity as a tribe with the Tuscarora. The Tuscarora Nation of New York, says that the great majority of the tribe moved north to New York. New York leaders consider any individuals remaining in North Carolina as no longer having tribal status, although they have Tuscarora genetic ancestry.

Both the New York Tuscarora and the North Carolina Tuscarora bands claim the historical name of the tribe. As the New York tribe is federally recognized and is the longest organized as a tribal government, it is considered the legal successor to the historic tribe. Members of North Carolina bands claim descent and continuity with the ancient Skarure. Some North Carolina Tuscarora feel that the Tuscarora that left North Carolina abandoned the home lands, and that both groups should be allowed to have a relationship with the federal government.

In the 1930s, the Department of Interior conducted physical examinations of 209 individuals residing in Robeson County and determined that 22 possessed at least 1/2 or more degree of Indian blood, and that 18 more were borderline or near-borderline cases. Scholars and scientists no longer consider such physical exams to be a valid method of determining biological ancestry. Each federally recognized tribe has the authority to determine membership criteria and establish its own rules. These are generally based on documented descent from a historical list of agreed-upon members or descent from known living members.

In the 1960s, the surviving eight of these 22 people, with many of their descendants and approximately 2,000 other individuals in their communities organized an official Tuscarora political infrastructure in Robeson County. On November 12, 1979 the "Tuscarora Tribe of Indians Maxton" were accepted into the National Congress of American Indians.

Various factions of the Robeson County-based Tuscarora, who have split since their initial organization in the 1960s, have worked for state and federal recognition. A petition by the Hatteras Tuscarora, submitted to the federal government in 1978, was placed on hold.

In 1989, the Solicitor of the Department of Interior ruled that the Lumbee Act of 1956, which acknowledged the Lumbee as Native American, at the same time barred all Indians within Robeson and adjoining counties from consideration as a federally recognized tribe within the "Branch of Acknowledgement and Research" petitioning process. Leaders of the Lumbee had agreed to this provision at the time the legislation was passed. This provision was applied to the Lumbee petition of 1986 seeking federal recognition as a tribe. Gerald M. Sider states that rather than challenging this ruling, "The Lumbee subsequently removed their petition from active consideration by the BIA in a way that also prevented the Tuscarora petitions from being considered."

In 2006 the Skaroreh Katenuaka Nation, "AKA: Tuscarora Nation of Indians of North Carolina", filed a federal lawsuit for recognition. Skaroreh Katenuaka Nation, the Hatteras Tuscarora, and the Tuscarora Nation of the Carolinas are all based in Robeson County. Members are closely related to one another.

In May 2010 leaders and individuals from the various Tuscarora factions in the Robeson County area came together to form the Tuscarora Nation One Fire Council (TNOFC). The TNOFC is an interim, un-incorporated government; they have based it on provisions outlined in wampum 96 of the Haudenosaunee (Iroquois League) Great Law of Peace. The TNOFC assembles weekly. Its members are working toward developing and implementing solutions to problems that have created division among them in the past. The TNOFC maintains separate membership enrollment from, and their members are not part of, the state-recognized Lumbee Tribe of North Carolina, the largest state-recognized tribe in North Carolina and are also located in Robeson County. Between March 21st and 23rd in 2013, citizens of both the Tuscarora in New York and North Carolina reunited at the 300 year anniversary of the Fort Neoheroka massacre.

In July 2018, following a year long state and federal investigation, more than 26 people of the Tuscarora Nation including its leader, were arrested for operating three casinos, an unlicensed police force and marijuana growing operations in Maxton and Red Springs, North Carolina. Local sheriff's office and police were joined by state SBI, state and federal Bureau of Alcohol, Tobacco, Firearms and Explosives, and National Guard troops in seizing vehicles, currency, marijuana, firearms and over 200 illegal gaming machines.  Those arrested face drug, gambling and money laundering charges though claim sovereign citizen status and, according to a North Carolina Alcohol Law Enforcement official "openly expressed beliefs that neither the laws of North Carolina nor the United States applied to them"

Tuscarora descendants in Oklahoma
Some Tuscarora descendants live in Oklahoma. They are primarily descendants of Tuscarora groups absorbed in the early decades of the nineteenth century in Ohio by relocated Iroquois Seneca and Cayuga bands from New York. They became known as Mingo while in the Midwest, coalescing as a group in Ohio. The Mingo were later forced in Indian Removals to Indian Territory in present-day Kansas, and lastly, in Oklahoma. In 1937 descendants reorganized and were federally recognized as the Seneca-Cayuga Tribe of Oklahoma. The nation occupies territory in the northeast corner of the former Indian Territory. A band of Tuscarora also moved to Oberlin, Fremont, and Elmore, Ohio in the mid 1800s from New Bern, North Carolina and participated in the Underground Railroad.

Notable Tuscarora
Wallace "Mad Bear" Anderson (1927–1985), Native activist
David Cusick, artist and author
Dennis Cusick, painter
Eric Gansworth, poet and visual artist
John Napoleon Brinton Hewitt, linguist and ethnographer
Henry Berry Lowrie, led a resistance in North Carolina during and after the American Civil War.
Frank Mount Pleasant (1884–1937), athlete
Clinton Rickard (1882–1971), Native activist
Alicia Elliott, author

Iroquoian-speaking peoples
 Cherokee
 Chonnonton
 Erie
 Huron
 Iroquois
 Meherrin
 Nottoway
 Mohawk
 Petun (See also Protohistory of West Virginia )
 Susquehannock (Conestoga)

See also

Federal Power Commission v. Tuscarora Indian Nation
Christoph von Graffenried
Native American tribes in Maryland
Tuscarora First Nation

References

Further reading
 Patrick Keith, Through Colonialism and Imperialism: The Struggle for Tuscarora Nationhood in Southeastern North Carolina, M.A. Thesis, 2005, University of Arizona
 John R. Swanton, "The Indians of the Southeastern United States", Smithsonian Institution, Bureau of American Ethnology Bulletin 137 (Washington, D.C., 1946)
 Bruce G. Trigger, ed., Northeast, vol. 15 of Handbook of North American Indians, ed. William C. Sturtevant (Washington: Smithsonian Institution, 1978)
 Anthony F. C. Wallace, "The Modal Personality Structure of the Tuscarora Indians", Smithsonian Institution, Bureau of American Ethnology Bulletin 150 (Washington, D.C., 1952)
 Anthony F. C. Wallace, Tuscarora: A History (Albany: SUNY Press, 2012)

External links
Tuscarora and Six Nations Websites, official website
Six Nations Of The Grand River Territory, official website

 
 
Federally recognized tribes in the United States
First Nations in Ontario
Indigenous peoples of the Northeastern Woodlands
Iroquois
Native American history of New York (state)
Native American tribes in Maryland
Native American tribes in New York (state)
Native American tribes in North Carolina
Native American tribes in West Virginia
Native Americans in the American Revolution